Anita (born Anita Spanner, 22 December 1960 in Fürstenfeld District, Styria) is an Austrian singer, best known for her participation in the 1984 Eurovision Song Contest.

Eurovision Song Contest 

Anita came to the Austrian Eurovision selection in 1984 as a virtual unknown, but her song "Einfach weg" ("Simply Gone") was the clear winner of the 12 entrants, sending her to the 29th Eurovision Song Contest, held in Luxembourg City on 5 May. In Luxembourg however, "Einfach weg" (with Gary Lux among the backing vocalists) met an ignominious fate, finishing in last place of the 19 entries garnering only five points, well below the 26 points of the next-lowest ranked song from Yugoslavia.

Nevertheless, "Einfach weg" proved to be a domestic hit in Austria, topping the chart for two weeks.

Later career 

Anita released further singles but could not repeat the success of "Einfach weg" in the home market.  In 1991, she again took part in the Austrian Eurovision selection, but "Land in Sicht" ("Land in Sight") could only finish seventh of the 10 songs.

In the mid-1990s Anita withdrew from the public eye to raise a family.  She has recently returned to performing as a member of a seven-piece live band called Hit4You.

References 

1960 births
Living people
People from Fürstenfeld District
20th-century Austrian women singers
Eurovision Song Contest entrants for Austria
Eurovision Song Contest entrants of 1984